Mato Grosso ( – ) is one of the states of Brazil, the third largest by area, located in the Central-West region. The state has 1.66% of the Brazilian population and is responsible for 1.9% of the Brazilian GDP.

Neighboring states (from west clockwise) are: Rondônia, Amazonas, Pará, Tocantins, Goiás and Mato Grosso do Sul. A state with a flat landscape that alternates between vast chapadas and plain areas, Mato Grosso contains three main ecosystems: the Cerrado, the Pantanal and the Amazon rainforest.

The Chapada dos Guimarães National Park, with its caves, grottoes, tracks, and waterfalls, is one of its tourist attractions. The extreme northwest of the state has a small part of the Amazonian forest. The Xingu Indigenous Park and the Araguaia River are in Mato Grosso. Farther south, the Pantanal, the world's largest wetland, is the habitat for nearly one thousand species of animals and many aquatic birds.

Geography

The terrain of Mato Grosso is varied and includes cliffs, canyons, and waterfalls. It is home to the Chapada dos Guimarães National Park, a unique environment of sandstone mountains that have eroded into amazingly varied terrain.

The biologically rich Pantanal, one of the world's largest wetland/prairie ecosystems, is also located within this state. Much environmental degradation has occurred to the Pantanal since the late 20th century because of development, and efforts to contain or slow it have had limited success. The Pantanal has a habitat similar to that of the Everglades in Florida in the United States, although the Pantanal is on a much larger scale.

History

The Bororo Indians live in the Mato Grosso area. As late as 1880, soldiers patrolled lands on the outskirts of Cuiabá, Mato Grosso's capital and largest city, to protect settlers from Bororo raids.

By the end of the 19th century, although severely reduced by disease and by warfare with explorers, slave traders, prospectors, settlers, and other indigenous groups, as many as five to 10 thousand Bororo continued to occupy central and eastern Mato Grosso, as well as western Goiás. The southwestern part of this state was ceded by Brazil to Bolivia in exchange for the then-Bolivian territory of Acre, according to the Treaty of Petrópolis in 1903.

This historically remote area attracted expeditions of exploration in the early 20th century that sought to find lost civilizations. A notable example was British Captain Percy Fawcett's expedition to find the Lost City of Z which he believed existed in the jungles of Brazil. Certain proponents of the Hollow Earth hypothesis speculated that the region had sites of access to the interior of the earth and its settlements.

In 1977, the state was split into two halves, and the neighboring state of Mato Grosso do Sul was created from the other part of its territory.

Demographics

Mato Grosso had a high rate of population growth in the 20th century due to timber, ranching and agricultural development. The state as a whole has one of the lowest population densities of any Brazilian state. According to the Brazilian Institute of Geography and Statistics (IBGE), 3,441,998 people resided in the state as of 2018. The population density was 3.8 inhabitants/km2.

Urbanization: 76.6% (2006)
Population growth: 2.4% (1991–2000)
Houses: 836,000 (2006)

Ethnically, the state includes a relatively high proportion of caboclos (persons of mixed European and Indian ancestry), as do other areas of interior Brazil. The last PNAD (National Research for Sample of Domiciles) census revealed the following numbers: 1,532,000 Brown (Mixed) people (50.92%); 1,179,000 White people (39.16%); 239,000 Black people (7.93%); 41,000 Amerindian people (1.37%); and 14,000 Asian people (0.45%).

Largest cities

Education

Portuguese is the official national language and the primary language taught in schools. English and Spanish are also taught as part of the official high school curriculum.

More than 58 universities are located in the state of Mato Grosso.

Cuiabá is home to the following universities:
Federal University of Mato Grosso (UFMT);
Mato Grosso State University (Unemat);
 (Unic).

Economy

Agriculture is the largest component of the state's GDP at 40.8%, followed by the service sector at 40.2%. The industrial sector represents 19% of the GDP (2004). Mato Grosso's major exports include soybeans (83%), wood (5.6%), meats (4.8%), and cotton (3.3%) (2002).

The state's share of the Brazilian economy is 1.8% (2014).
In 2020, Mato Grosso was the leader in the national grain production, with 28.0%. It's the largest producer of soy in Brazil, with 26.9% of the total produced in 2020 (33.0 million tons); the largest producer of maize in the country; the largest producer of cotton in Brazil, with around 65% of national production (1.8 out of the 2.8 million tons harvested in the country).; the sixth largest producer of sugarcane in the country, 16 million tons harvested in the 2019/20 harvest.; and the third largest producer of beans, with 10.5% of Brazilian production. In sunflowers, the state was the largest national producer in 2019, with 60,000 tons. In cassava production, Brazil produced a total of 17.6 million tons in 2018. Mato Grosso produced 287,000  tons at this year.

In 2019, the cattle herd from Mato Grosso reached the mark of 30 million cattle, the largest cattle herd in the country, representing almost 14% of national production alone. In 2018, Mato Grosso was the fifth largest pork producer in the country, with a herd of around 2.5 million animals.

In 2017, Mato Grosso had 1.15% of the national mineral participation (fifth place in the country). Mato Grosso had production of gold (8.3 tons at a value of R$1 billion) and tin (536 tons at a value of R$16 million). In addition, in gemstones, the state is the second largest national producer of diamond, having extracted 49,000 carats in the year 2017. The city of Juína is the main one in this activity in the state. The state also has a small production of sapphire and jasper.

Mato Grosso had an industrial GDP of R$17.0 billion in 2017, equivalent to 1.4% of the national industry. It employs 141,121 workers in the industry. The main industrial sectors are: Construction (32.0%), Food (27.9%), Industrial Services of Public Utility, such as Electricity and Water (18.6%), Beverages (4.5%) and Oil Products Oil and Biofuels (3.9%). These five sectors concentrate 86.9% of the state's industry.

Statistics
Vehicles: 1,614,797 (January 2015)
Mobile phones: 4,500,000 (January 2015)
Telephones: 527,000 (April 2007)
Cities: 141 (2007)

Infrastructure

Roads  

Mato Grosso had, in 2020, 141,171 km of municipal roads; on the roads of the state of Mato Grosso there were 22,399 km of unpaved roads, 7,281 km of paved roads and 81 km of duplicated highways. In the federal road network, there were 3,649 km of roads, including 330 km of duplicated highways. Mato Grosso, despite being a more recently occupied state, already has a 2-lane highway in each direction connecting the capital Cuiabá to one of the largest cities in the state, Rondonópolis, then to the border with Mato Grosso do Sul.

Some of the main roads are:

BR-070
BR-173
BR-174
BR-158
BR-163
BR-197
BR-242
BR-252
BR-364
MT-100
MT-358

Airports

It now serves more than half a million passengers a year.

The runway at Marechal Rondon was opened to traffic in 1956. In February 1975, Infraero took over the airport's administration and began various upgrades to meet the needs of the airport complex.

Railways 
The   connects Mato Grosso with the state of São Paulo and sea ports. Rumo Logística only operates freight trains on the line, which runs as far inland as Rondonópolis. An extension northward to Cuiabá and Lucas do Rio Verde is planned as of 2021.

It crosses the large Rollemberg–Vuolo Bridge over the Paraná River when passing into Mato Grosso do Sul.

Flag

The state flag has similar colors to the flag of Brazil, with blue symbolizing the sky, green the vegetation, and white standing for peace. The star is yellow to symbolize the gold which attracted the first settlers. The flag was adopted by Decree No. 2 of January 31, 1890, just a few days after the adoption of the national flag. The Mato Grosso state flag was abolished by Law No. 1.046 of October 8, 1929, but reinstated by article 140 of the Constitution of the State of Mato Grosso on July 11, 1947.

Tourism and recreation

Alta Floresta
Fishing in the Teles Pires, São Benedito and Azul rivers is productive practically all year long.

Chapada dos Guimarães

North Pantanal
The Pantanal's backbone is the Paraguay River, which cuts through the region from north to south. The Miranda, Aquidauna, Taquari, and Cuiabá rivers flow into the Paraguay River. From October to April, the high waters reveal outsized lakes, bays, river branches, and outlets.

The Transpantaneira Highway connects the town of Poconé to Jofre Port, along the Cuiabá River bank. On the way, it is possible to observe wild animals, especially alligators, capybaras, and birds, among other wild animals.

Águas Quentes State Park
The  Águas Quentes State Park, the first protected area in Mato Grosso, is known for the healing powers of its thermal waters.

Lagoa Azul State Park
Its primary attraction is a limestone cave with a pool of blue water and unusual cave formations. These have suffered from vandalism, causing the cave to be closed until measures to protect it could be implemented.
The blue lagoon cave holds a pool of blue water formed from underground water of the Saloba River.
The main entrance is filled in part by the water.
There may be archaeological remains in the cave.
The park has several other limestone caves.
It is covered with deciduous forests, and is home to howler monkeys, tapirs, jaguars, and macaws.

Gallery

Sports

Cuiabá was one of 12 cities chosen to host the games of the 2014 FIFA World Cup, which took place in Brazil.

In the state were born the medalists of the World Championships Felipe Lima in swimming and David Moura in judo, in addition to the world champions of futsal Vinícius and Lenísio.

References

External links 

 Official website of Mato Grosso

 
States of Brazil